Jammu Suraksha Yojana is a collaborative initiative by REIT under ITI Limited and Jammu Municipal Corporation. This is started to provide digital security and surveillance products to the citizen of Jammu at subsidized prices. As a mega initiative, REIT is providing Personal security, financial security and civil security to the citizens of Jammu. It has planned to provide digital security to the citizen of Jammu at very reasonable rates. The citizens can also avail life insurance up to Rs 1,00,000 in case of death.
Jammu Suraksha Yojana is the first initiative taken by the government department for general public security. The Scheme is launched by the Deputy Mayor JMC, Purnima Sharma, JMC Commissioner Pankaj Magotra KAS and officials from ITI Limited.

The Scheme 
Jammu Suraksha Yojana is initiated to secure the citizens of Jammu and to provide subsidized security solutions so that to make security affordable for the general public. Under Jammu Suraksha Yojana, the subscriber will get security services like Personal Security, Financial Security, and Civil Security. The subscriber has to pay Rs. 500 monthly and GST as applicable to avail Jammu Suraksha Yojana Scheme.

Personal Security 
Jammu Municipal Corporation has took a step further to secure every citizen of Jammu. In personal security, the subscriber will get:
 High definition indoor camera and outdoor camera based on Artificial Intelligence.
The subscriber will also get two sets of Electro-magnetic waves based Wireless Door Sensors.

Financial Security 
The main motive to provide financial security to the citizen of Jammu is to stabilize the financial condition of the citizen in case of mishappening. In financial security, the subscriber will have life insurance cover up to Rs. 1,00,000 in case of Death.

Civil Security (SOS Alert) 
REIT has introduced an SOS Alert application for Citizens of India to provide instant security and rescue help during criminal or civil incidents. When a person feels any kind of discomfort or insecurity or teasing on public or private places, he/she has to press the SOS Button and the application will start and send all details like Name, Phone number, Address, live Location and other required details to Police control Room and a police officer will be assigned to rescue the person within seconds according to the application prototype. Besides, the REIT SOS Alert app will also provide a free self-defense course to the needy to defend himself/herself in public and private places.

Services
2 Door sensors
2 sets of electromagnetic waves Wireless door sensor
Artificial Intelligence High Definition Indoor Camera
Cloud Monitoring
Dedicated Customer Support
Digital Security
Financial support to the family in case of subscriber death and insurance up to 1 lacs.
High Definition Outdoor camera
High definition recording
Immediate SOS alert to the Family and Civil Police
Online view
The recording time of 10-35 days
Theft alert

REIT Suvidha Centers 
REIT India, under ITI Limited in collaboration with Jammu Municipal Corporation, has started various REIT Suvidha Centers to facilitate the subscribers. The REIT Suvidha Centers are started in every municipal ward of Jammu city. The applicant will have to visit the REIT Suvidha centers to avail government Scheme.

References

External links

Government schemes in India